Matignon is a French surname. Notable people with the surname include:

Camille Matignon (1867–1934), French chemist
Guillaume Matignon, French trading card game player
Pierre Matignon (1943–1987), French cyclist
Renaud Matignon (1936–1998), French journalist and writer

French-language surnames